The Danish American Frontier Award is the most prestigious honor awarded by the Danish American community in the western United States.

The DAF Award is presented to a person or group of persons who have distinguished themselves by their actions, exploration or presence in areas of leadership, business, commerce, service, science, technology, invention, arts or humanitarian ventures.
 
The recipient is given a statuette by the Danish-American sculptor, Dennis Smith, depicting Peter Lassen, the most important of early Danish-American pioneers and frontiersmen. The largest land areas named after a Dane outside of Denmark are named after him - Lassen County  and Lassen Volcanic Park. The statuette is handmade and numbered exclusively for recipients of the award.

The inaugural award ceremony took place on April 3, 2016, in San Francisco.

References

External links
 www.dafaward.com

Danish-American culture